Rocket Knight is a 2.5D platforming video game developed by Climax Studios and published by Konami for Xbox 360, PlayStation 3 and Microsoft Windows. The game was released on May 11, 2010 for Microsoft Windows and May 12, 2010 on consoles, with the exception of the PlayStation 3 release in North America, which was released on May 18, 2010. The Microsoft Windows release is not available in Europe.

Rocket Knight is a revival of the Sparkster series, which first began with Rocket Knight Adventures. The game is a sequel to the Sega Genesis game Sparkster: Rocket Knight Adventures 2, and not a remake of Rocket Knight Adventures.

Gameplay

The game is shown at a slightly zoomed out perspective, allowing less dangerous use of the jetpack, and uses the auto-filling power meter from Sparkster: Rocket Knight Adventures 2, which powers both the jetpack and sword attacks featured in Rocket Knight Adventures (neither Rocket Knight Adventures nor the SNES Sparkster game have an auto-power meter). Sparkster cannot perform consecutive boosts, but can temporarily hover in midair. There are other tweaks, such as Sparkster only bouncing off walls when he hits them at a 45 degree angle. He is also able to shoot short range projectiles and perform a drill attack which allows him to break through certain surfaces. Sparkster's attack range is also complete, allowing him to deflect certain projectiles with his sword. Like previous entries, there are side-scrolling shooting segments, where Sparkster can charge his shots and use his jetpack to quickly avoid obstacles. There are several items and power ups along the way, with point and life bonuses earned for collecting all of a certain item in a level.

Plot
Sparkster, upon his return from fighting the Gedol empire in Sparkster: Rocket Knight Adventures 2, is surprised to find that the Devotindos empire, the pigs that he had fought previously in Rocket Knight Adventures, had taken up residence in the Kingdom of Zephyrus along with the opossums inhabitants under permission granted by the Zephyrus king performed to the General Sweinhart, a war veteran from the previous war between Zepyrus and Devotindos. With his warning claims being ignored by the Zephyrus king, Sparkster decides to move elsewhere to live with his family for a while, assuming he was no longer as useful as he was.

Fifteen years later, a new threat to Zephyrus has arrived. Sparkster is surprised to find the pigs fighting alongside the opossums against an army of wolves, with Sparkster's nemesis, Axel Gear, acting as Rocket Knight in his absence. Suspecting something may be amiss, Sparkster decides to put on his gear and head back into the fray, ready to fight the wolf army. However, when Sparkster eventually defeats the leader of the Wolf army in their homeland, General Sweinhart turns the Devotindos empire once again against the opossums, their one other threat eliminated. Sparkster must return to Zephyrus to save his kingdom and defeat the Devotindos army.

Development and release

When producer Tomm Hulett joined Konami, he decided to work on a pitch for a revival for Sparkster, which was accepted after two years and four pitches. Hulett claims, "it was really a matter of reworking the concept – making the right pitch at the right time," with various recent franchise revivals receiving positive responses at the time. Hulett also said that Konami thought Climax Studios were the best pick partly due to their facial animation technology, allowing Sparkster to produce expressions respective to his 16-bit counterparts. A trailer was released on October 9, 2009.

Rocket Knight is one of the game's featured in Xbox's November 2021 Games with Gold lineup, where the game was made for free for the month for Xbox Live Gold and Game Pass Ultimate subscribers.

Reception

IGN gave the game a score of 7.5, praising the inventive platforming but showing concern for the high price point. Game Informer gave the game a score of 8 out of 10. GamesRadar gave the game 7/10, praising its mechanics but criticising its fluctuating difficulty, along with the high price point. 1up.com gave it a C+ grade, criticising its lack of variety.  Sales were near to 12,000 units as of year-end 2010.

See also
 Rocket Knight Adventures
 Sparkster: Rocket Knight Adventures 2
 Sparkster

References

External links
 
 Rocket Knight 5 Day Feature  at 1up.com

2010 video games
Climax Group games
Fictional opossums
Konami games
Platform games
PlayStation Network games
Side-scrolling video games
Video games developed in the United Kingdom
Video games with 2.5D graphics
Video game sequels
Windows games
Xbox 360 Live Arcade games
Steampunk video games
Single-player video games